Live From Nowhere, Volume 4 is a live album by Over the Rhine, released in 2009, containing highlights from the band's 2008 shows. The CD is a limited edition and comes in a fold-out digipak.

Track listing

This album was recorded during a two night stand at one of their "hometown " venues and features a reunion of the original lineup.

Personnel
Linford Detweiler: Bass, Keyboards
Karin Bergquist: Vocals, Acoustic Guitar, Electric Guitar, Keyboards
Kim Taylor: Backing Vocals
Julie Lee: Backing Vocals
Brian Kelley: Drums, Vocals
Ric Hordinski: Electric Guitar

Credits
Paul Mahern: Mixing
Roger Seibel: Mastering
Owen Brock: Design
Clinton Reno & Rob Seiffert: Artwork [Tour Posters]
Michael Wilson: Photography
Bill Ivester: Photography [Concert Photos]

Notes
Volume four of the band's live recording series. This release documents the group's 20th Anniversary Reunion Concert with original bandmates Ric Hordinski and Brian Kelley.

Recorded Live, Friday, December 19, 2008 at The Taft Theatre in Cincinnati, Ohio.

All songs © Over the Rhine/Scampering Songs Publishing et al., ASCAP.

Recordings mixed at Echo Park Studio B in Bloomington, IN.

Mastered at SAE Mastering in Phoenix, AZ.

Over the Rhine (band) albums
2009 live albums